Vicente Paúl Rondón (July 29, 1938 – December 28, 1992) was a Venezuelan professional boxer who competed from 1965 to 1974, holding the WBA light heavyweight title from 1971 to 1972.

Personal background 
Rondón was born into extreme poverty in San José de Río Chico, Miranda, Venezuela, and decided to escape his poor surroundings by enlisting in the Venezuelan military at an early age.

Professional career 
When Rondón turned professional, his year of birth was listed as 1944; in fact it was 1938. Rondón began fighting as a middleweight and made a name for himself with upset victories over former world welterweight champion Luis Rodríguez and middleweight contender Bennie Briscoe. However, Rondon was growing and quickly established himself as a top rated light heavyweight with impressive wins over Roger Rouse, Eddie Talhami, and Allen Thomas. World Light heavyweight Champion Bob Foster did not seem eager to fight the #2 ranked Rondón or the #1 rated Jimmy Dupree. The WBA stripped Foster of his title and matched Rondón and Dupree.

In an exciting slugfest, Rondón climbed off the canvas in the second round to stop the favored Dupree at 2:58 of the 6th round.  At the time of the stoppage, referee Zack Clayton had the fight scored even at 47–47. Judge Dimas Hernandez also scored the bout 47–47, and judge Gustavo Vargas favored Rondón, 48–47. Following the fight, a controversy broke out with Dupree claiming he was drugged. The United Press International published a story of the claim. In the UPI article, Charliese Smith, a registered nurse and friend of Dupree said, "I believe Jimmy was drugged. I saw Jimmy after the fight and he was very very weak. His vision was blurry and he couldn't even see the other side of the room." She went on to say, "I know of muscle relaxants that can be administered in food and I'm convinced that Jimmy was given something." Regardless of the charges, the World Boxing Association recognized Rondón as world champion, while The Ring magazine viewed Bob Foster as the legitimate Light heavyweight king.

1971 was an outstanding year for Rondón with a number of title defenses. He became the first and only fighter to stop Gomeo Brennan. Many experts felt that Rondón could and would defeat Bob Foster. Rondon flopped badly against Foster in 1972; being destroyed in two rounds. A venture into the heavyweight ranks proved just as bad, as he was beaten by Earnie Shavers, Ron Lyle and José Urtain. Rondón did better in 1973 as he started to trim down in weight. He looked highly skilled and impressive by scoring a 10-round decision over undefeated prospect Oliver Wright on Miami Beach. Shortly after, he stopped heavyweight Mike "Jim" Boswell in four rounds.

Sadly, Rondón's private life was full of demons. He was developing a drinking problem and spending money like it was going out of style. An attempt to regain the light heavyweight title, saw him drop a decision to number 1 rated Len Hutchins, and then suffer a 9th-round technical knockout to John Conteh. In 1974, Rondón, weighing 188 pounds, went back to the heavyweight division, where he would be largely unsuccessful. He was unable to get off the stool for round three in his fight with Rodney Bobick at Miami Beach, Florida. In his next fight he was knocked out in two rounds by former world heavyweight title contender José Roman.

Life after boxing 
Shortly thereafter Rondón's career hit the skids and so did he. He was confined to a mental hospital, and later arrested on charges of robbing a store for $150. Rondon served a prison sentence, and there are unconfirmed reports that he boxed some exhibitions or possibly a professional match while incarcerated. Rondón was released from prison a physical wreck.  Vicente Paul Rondón, the boxing idol of his country, died forgotten, broke and in poverty in Santa Ana de Carapita, a slum of Caracas. Rondón had been living with his elderly mother at the time. He was 54 when he died.

Professional boxing record 

|-
| style="text-align:center;" colspan="8"|39 Wins (22 knockouts), 15 Losses (7 knockouts), 1 Draw, 2 No Contests
|-  style="text-align:center; background:#e3e3e3;"
|  style="border-style:none none solid solid; "|Res.
|  style="border-style:none none solid solid; "|Record
|  style="border-style:none none solid solid; "|Opponent
|  style="border-style:none none solid solid; "|Type
|  style="border-style:none none solid solid; "|RoundTime
|  style="border-style:none none solid solid; "|Date
|  style="border-style:none none solid solid; "|Location
|  style="border-style:none none solid solid; "|Notes
|- align=center
|Loss||39–15–1||align=left| José Roman
|
|
|
|align=left|
|align=left|
|- align=center
|Loss||39–14–1||align=left| Rodney Bobick
|
|
|
|align=left|
|align=left|
|- align=center
|Loss||39–13–1||align=left| Rudiger Schmidtke
|
|
|
|align=left|
|align=left|
|- align=center
|Loss||39–12–1||align=left| John Conteh
|
|
|
|align=left|
|align=left|
|- align=center
|Win||39–11–1||align=left| Mike Boswell
|
|
|
|align=left|
|align=left|
|- align=center
|Loss||38–11–1||align=left| Tom Bogs
|
|
|
|align=left|
|align=left|
|- align=center
|Loss||38–10–1||align=left| Len Hutchins
|
|
|
|align=left|
|align=left|
|- align=center
|Win||38–9–1||align=left| Oliver Wright
|
|
|
|align=left|
|align=left|
|- align=center
|Win||37–9–1||align=left| Larry Beilfuss
|
|
|
|align=left|
|align=left|
|- align=center
|Loss||36–9–1||align=left| José Manuel Urtain
|
|
|
|align=left|
|align=left|
|- align=center
|Loss||36–8–1||align=left| Earnie Shavers
|
|
|
|align=left|
|align=left|
|- align=center
|Loss||36–7–1||align=left| Ron Lyle
|
|
|
|align=left|
|align=left|
|- align=center
|Loss||36–6–1||align=left| Bob Foster
|
|
|
|align=left|
|align=left|
|- align=center
|Win||36–5–1||align=left| Doyle Baird
|
|
|
|align=left|
|align=left|
|- align=center
|Win||35–5–1||align=left| Gomeo Brennan
|
|
|
|align=left|
|align=left|
|- align=center
|Win||34–5–1||align=left| Conny Velensek
|
|
|
|align=left|
|align=left|
|- align=center
|Win||33–5–1||align=left| Eddie Jones
|
|
|
|align=left|
|align=left|
|- align=center
|Win||32–5–1||align=left| Johnny Griffin
|
|
|
|align=left|
|align=left|
|- align=center
|Win||31–5–1||align=left| Piero del Papa
|
|
|
|align=left|
|align=left|
|- align=center
|Win||30–5–1||align=left| Jimmy Dupree
|
|
|
|align=left|
|align=left|
|- align=center
|Win||29–5–1||align=left| Roger Rouse
|
|
|
|align=left|
|align=left|
|- align=center
|Win||28–5–1||align=left| Willie Johnson
|
|
|
|align=left|
|align=left|
|- align=center
|Win||27–5–1||align=left| Hydra Lacy
|
|
|
|align=left|
|align=left|
|- align=center
|Win||26–5–1||align=left| Levan Roundtree
|
|
|
|align=left|
|align=left|
|- align=center
|Win||25–5–1||align=left| Fred Williams
|
|
|
|align=left|
|align=left|
|- align=center
|Win||24–5–1||align=left| Avenamar Peralta
|
|
|
|align=left|
|align=left|
|- align=center
|Win||23–5–1||align=left| Randy Stevens
|
|
|
|align=left|
|align=left|
|- align=center
|Win||22–5–1||align=left| Angel Oquendo
|
|
|
|align=left|
|align=left|
|- align=center
|||21–5–1||align=left| Paul Johnson
|
|
|
|align=left|
|align=left|
|- align=center
|Win||21–5–1||align=left| Eddie Talhami
|
|
|
|align=left|
|align=left|
|- align=center
|Win||20–5–1||align=left| José Luis García
|
|
|
|align=left|
|align=left|
|- align=center
|Win||19–5–1||align=left| Karl Zurheide
|
|
|
|align=left|
|align=left|
|- align=center
|Win||18–5–1||align=left| Allen Thomas
|
|
|
|align=left|
|align=left|
|- align=center
|Loss||17–5–1||align=left| Bennie Briscoe
|
|
|
|align=left|
|align=left|
|- align=center
|Win||17–4–1||align=left| Charlie Jordan
|
|
|
|align=left|
|align=left|
|- align=center
|Win||16–4–1||align=left| Charlie Jordan
|
|
|
|align=left|
|align=left|
|- align=center
|Loss||15–4–1||align=left| Juarez de Lima
|
|
|
|align=left|
|align=left|
|- align=center
|Win||15–3–1||align=left| Bennie Briscoe
|
|
|
|align=left|
|align=left|
|- align=center
|Win||14–3–1||align=left| Charley Austin
|
|
|
|align=left|
|align=left|
|- align=center
|Loss||13–3–1||align=left| Luis Manuel Rodríguez
|
|
|
|align=left|
|align=left|
|- align=center
|Win||13–2–1||align=left| Luis Manuel Rodríguez
|
|
|
|align=left|
|align=left|
|- align=center
|Loss||12–2–1||align=left| José González
|
|
|
|align=left|
|align=left|
|- align=center
|Loss||12–1–1||align=left| Bobby Warthen
|
|
|
|align=left|
|align=left|
|- align=center
|Win||12–0–1||align=left| Phil Robinson
|
|
|
|align=left|
|align=left|
|- align=center
|style="background:#abcdef;"|Draw||11–0–1||align=left| Harold Richardson
|
|
|
|align=left|
|align=left|
|- align=center
|Win||11–0||align=left| Pedro Miranda
|
|
|
|align=left|
|align=left|
|- align=center
|Win||10–0||align=left| Tony Smith
|
|
|
|align=left|
|align=left|
|- align=center
|Win||9–0||align=left| Marco Tulio Polanco
|
|
|
|align=left|
|align=left|
|- align=center
|Win||8–0||align=left| Danny Machado
|
|
|
|align=left|
|align=left|
|- align=center
|||7–0||align=left| Marco Tulio Polanco
|
|
|
|align=left|
|align=left|
|- align=center
|Win||7–0||align=left| Marcos Pirella
|
|
|
|align=left|
|align=left|
|- align=center
|Win||6–0||align=left| Melville Bennett
|
|
|
|align=left|
|align=left|
|- align=center
|Win||5–0||align=left| Marco Tulio Polanco
|
|
|
|align=left|
|align=left|
|- align=center
|Win||4–0||align=left| Pedro Vanegas
|
|
|
|align=left|
|align=left|
|- align=center
|Win||3–0||align=left| Pedro Vanegas
|
|
|
|align=left|
|align=left|
|- align=center
|Win||2–0||align=left| Joe Louis Troconis
|
|
|
|align=left|
|align=left|
|- align=center
|Win||1–0||align=left| Joe Carabella
|
|
|
|align=left|
|align=left|

See also 

List of WBA world champions

References 

Ring Boxing Record Book 1975.
Miami Herald, February 20, 1974, Sports.
Fight Program: JOE KING ROMAN VS LEVI FORTE, March 17, 1977, War Memorial Auditorium, Tastee Concerts Sports (James P. Keough, promoter, Rocky Golio, matchmaker, John Ferero, coordinator)-Promotion, Robert L. Agree and VFW Post No. 1966, page 3: Joe King Roman Bio: "Fought LHVY Champion Vincente Rondon(1975), won by knockout in 10 rounds.
Ring Magazine, June 1971, pages 30,59: RONDON STOPS DUPREE BUT THE RING STILL BACKS FOSTER, by Randy Gallagher.

External links
 Brief biography
 

1938 births
1992 deaths
People from Miranda (state)
Light-heavyweight boxers
World Boxing Association champions
Venezuelan male boxers